Szentpétery Ádám (born 24 February 1956) is a Hungarian artist in Slovakia and the Department Head/Professor of the Studio of Contemporary Image at the Faculty of Arts at the Technical University of Košice, Slovakia. He is known primarily for his abstract painting with strong geometrically organized canvases in a highly original manner with a very intense but at the same time refined colorism.

Life and career
Szentpétery was born in Rožňava, Czechoslovakia. From 1971 to 1975 he studied at the School of Applied Arts in Košice (department of graphic arts). From 1976 to 1982, he studied at the Academy of Fine Arts and Design in Bratislava at the studio of monumental painting in the course taught by Assoc. prof. Dezider Castiglione and Assoc. prof. Ivan Vychlopen. Since 1999 he is the head of the Studio of Contemporary Image at the Faculty of Arts at the Technical University in Košice  (since 2004 – associate professor). In 2007 Szentpétery was awarded a ““ (i.e. state prize) in Budapest (Hungary). Nowadays Szentpétery lives and works in Rožňava and Košice.

Work 
"When characterizing the works of the prominent Slovak painter Adam Szentpétery (born in 1956), from the very start it is necessary to emphasize that we shall communicate in the visual language of geometry with strong painting coding. Over the course of the 1980s, geometry became the matrix of his works onto which he places individual art outputs and links. The line, color, and surface are the primary building blocks of his picture system. Although in the course of decades Szentpétery has built a key monolithic painting programme in the field of geometric abstraction forming a unique contribution to the contemporary language of painting in Slovakia, it still remains a solitary phenomenon in the home environment."   Vladimír Beskid,

Exhibitions 
Since 1984 until now Szentpétery exhibited his works in numerous solo (21) and group exhibitions (142) around the world, mostly in the countries of the European Union, but his paintings also got exhibited as far as Japan, Korea or Taiwan. The complete list of solo and group exhibitions is available in Adam Szentpétery's catalog.

In 2018 / 2019 Szentpétery exhibited his most recent works at the Danubiana Meulensteen Art Museum.

Works in collections 
 Východoslovenská galéria, VSG, Košice (Slovakia)
 Danubiana Meulensteen Art Museum, Bratislava (Slovakia)
 Východoslovenské múzeum, Košice (Slovakia)
 Banícke múzeum, Rožňava (Slovakia)
 Sbírka AVS, Prague (Czech Republic)
 Mestská galéria, Cottbus (Germany)
 Miskolci Galéria Miskolc (Hungary)
 Kortárs Magyar Galéria Dunajská Streda (Slovakia)
 Oravská galéria, Dolný Kubín (Slovakia)
 Gyergyószárhegyi Megyei Alkotóközpont – Lăzarea (Romania)
 Beratzhausener Sammlung, Beratzhausen (Germany)
 Adam Galery Brno (Czech Republic)

References

External links

Adam Szentpétery - instagram
Adam Szentpétery - catalogue of lifetime works
Adam Szentpétery / Wannieck Gallery
Adam Szentpétery / Pilsen
Adam Szentpétery / GEO CODES at DanubianaMeulensteen Art Museum
Adam Szentpétery / Srebrny Czworokąt
Adam Szentpétery / Koniarek galery Trnava 
Adam Szentpétery - www.webumenia.sk/web
Adam Szentpétery - www.webumenia.sk/dielo

1956 births
Living people
Hungarian painters
People from Rožňava
Hungarians in Slovakia
Slovak people of Hungarian descent
Abstract painters
Modern artists
Slovak painters
Contemporary painters
20th-century painters
Art educators
Czech painters